The genus Cercartetus is a group of very small possums known as pygmy possums. Four species comprise this genus, which together with the genus Burramys make up the marsupial family Burramyidae.

It has occasionally been presumed that Cercaërtus was a misspelling or synonym of Cercartetus. However, the name Cercaërtus is a junior synonym of Trichosurus and not of Cercartetus.

Conservation International (CI) and the Indonesia Institute of Science (LIPI) reported on the possible discovery of a new species of Cercartetus pygmy possum upon visit to the Foja Mountains in June 2007.

Species
Genus Cercartetus
Long-tailed pygmy possum, Cercartetus caudatus
Southwestern pygmy possum, Cercartetus concinnus
Tasmanian pygmy possum, Cercartetus lepidus
Eastern pygmy possum, Cercartetus nanus

References

Possums
Marsupials of Australia
Marsupial genera
Extant Pleistocene first appearances
Taxa named by C. L. Gloger